Sir Khalifa II bin Harub Al-Said    (26 August 1879 – 9 October 1960) was the ninth Sultan of Zanzibar from 9 December 1911 to 9 October 1960.

His father was Harub bin Thuwaini, a son of Thuwaini bin Said, Sultan of Muscat and Oman. In 1900, he married Sayyida Matuka bint Hamud Al-Busaid, daughter of the seventh Sultan of Zanzibar and sister of the eighth Sultan. He also married his second wife, Sultana Nunu. He was succeeded by his eldest surviving son, Sayyid Sir Abdullah bin Khalifa.

Part of the museum of the Sultan's Palace in Zanzibar is dedicated to Sir Khalifa.

Honours
King George V Coronation Medal-1911
Grand Cordon of the Saidi Order of Oman
King George V Silver Jubilee Medal-1935
Knight Grand Cross of the Order of the British Empire (GBE)-1935  (KBE-1919) (Honorary)
Knight Grand Cross of the Order of St Michael and St George (GCMG)-1936  (KCMG-1914)
King George VI Coronation Medal-1937
Commander of the Order of the Shield and Spears of Buganda
Queen Elizabeth II Coronation Medal-1953
Knight Grand Cross of the Order of the Bath (GCB)-1956

Ancestry

 

Al Said dynasty
1879 births
1960 deaths
Khalifa bin Harub
Honorary Knights Grand Cross of the Order of the Bath
Honorary Knights Grand Cross of the Order of St Michael and St George
Honorary Knights Grand Cross of the Order of the British Empire
Zanzibari royalty
19th-century Arabs
20th-century Arabs
19th-century Omani people
20th-century Omani people